The 12th IKF World Korfball Championship will be held in 2023 in Chinese Taipei. The International Korfball Federation awarded the hosting rights for the tournament to Chinese Taipei on 9 August 2019, ahead of the bids of Czech Republic and the Netherlands. The Netherlands was awarded the hosting rights for the 2027 IKF World Korfball Championship instead.

In November 2022, the number of teams participating was increased from 20 to 24. The Americas are now allotted 2 spots, Africa 2 spots, Europe 12 spots, and Asia and Oceania 7 spots (in addition to the host country), among which at least one Oceanian country. (with a minimum of 1 for Oceania).

Teams

Europe

 
 
 

Asia

 (Host)

Oceania

Africa

Americas

First Reserves:

References

External links
International Korfball Federation

IKF World Korfball Championship
2023 in korfball
Korfball World Championship
IKF World Korfball